Howe House may refer to:

 Howe House (Los Angeles, California), 2422 N. Silver Ridge Ave., Los Angeles, a Los Angeles Historic-Cultural Monument in Silver Lake
Edward P. Howe, Jr., House, Sacramento, California, listed on the NRHP in Sacramento County, California
Howe-Waffle House and Carriage House, Santa Ana, California, NRHP-listed
John I. Howe House, Derby, Connecticut, listed on the NRHP in New Haven County, Connecticut
Edgar W. Howe House, Atchison, Kansas, listed on the NRHP in Atchison County, Kansas
Richard Howe House, Emporia, Kansas, listed on the NRHP in Lyon County, Kansas
John Badlam Howe Mansion, Howe, Indiana, listed on the NRHP in LaGrange County, Indiana
 Howe House (Cambridge, Massachusetts), NRHP-listed
Samuel Gridley and Julia Ward Howe House, Boston, Massachusetts, NRHP-listed
Frank M. Howe Residence, Kansas City, Missouri, listed on the NRHP in Jackson County, Missouri
John G. Howe House, Stevensville, Montana, listed on the NRHP in Ravalli County, Montana
Gridley-Howe-Faden-Atkins Farmstead, Kimball, Nebraska, listed on the NRHP in Kimball County, Nebraska
Howe-Quimby House, Hopkinton, New Hampshire, listed on the NRHP in Merrimack County, New Hampshire
Dr. John Quincy Howe House, Phelps, New York, listed on the NRHP in New York
Ballard-Howe House, Seattle, Washington, listed on the NRHP in King County, Washington